GSM-R, Global System for Mobile Communications – Railway or GSM-Railway is an international wireless communications standard for railway communication and applications.

A sub-system of European Rail Traffic Management System (ERTMS), it is used for communication between train and railway regulation control centers. The system is based on GSM and EIRENE – MORANE specifications which guarantee performance at speeds up to 500 km/h (310 mph), without any communication loss.

GSM-R could be supplanted by LTE-R, with the first production implementation being in South Korea. However, LTE is generally considered to be a "4G" protocol, and the UIC's Future Railway Mobile Communication System (FRMCS) program is considering moving to something "5G"-based (specifically 3GPP R15/16), thus skipping two technological generations.

History 
GSM-R is built on GSM technology, and benefits from the economies of scale of its GSM technology heritage, aiming at being a cost efficient digital replacement for existing incompatible in-track cable and analogue railway radio networks. Over 35 different such systems are reported to exist in Europe alone.

The standard is the result of over ten years of collaboration between the various European railway companies, with the goal of achieving interoperability using a single communication platform. GSM-R is part of the European Rail Traffic Management System (ERTMS) standard and carries the signaling information directly to the train driver, enabling higher train speeds and traffic density with a high level of safety.

The specifications were finalized in 2000, based on the European Union-funded MORANE (Mobile Radio for Railways Networks in Europe) project. The specification is being maintained by the International Union of Railways project ERTMS. GSM-R has been selected by 38 countries across the world, including all member states of the European Union and countries in Asia, Eurasia and northern Africa.

GSM-R is a secure platform for voice and data communication between railway operational staff, including drivers, dispatchers, shunting team members, train engineers, and station controllers. It delivers features such as group calls (VGCS), voice broadcast (VBS), location-based connections, and call pre-emption in case of an emergency. This supports applications such as cargo tracking, video surveillance in trains and at stations, and passenger information services.

GSM-R is typically implemented using dedicated base station masts close to the railway, with tunnel coverage effected using directional antennae or 'leaky' feeder transmission. This creates a high degree of redundancy and higher availability and reliability. In Germany, Italy and France the GSM-R network has between 3,000 and 4,000 base stations. In areas where the European Train Control System (ETCS) Level 2 or 3 is used, the train maintains a circuit switched digital modem connection to the train control center at all times. This modem operates with higher priority than normal users (eMLPP). If the modem connection is lost, the train will automatically stop.

Upper system 
GSM-R is one part of ERTMS (European Rail Traffic Management System) which is composed of:
 ETCS (European Train Control System)
 GSM-R
 ETML (European Traffic Management Layer)
 EOR (European Operating Rules)

Frequency band 
GSM-R is standardized to be implemented in either the E-GSM (900 MHz-GSM) or DCS 1800 (1,800 MHz-GSM) frequency band which are both being used around the world.

Europe 
Europe includes the CEPT member states, which include all EU members and Albania, Andorra, Azerbaijan, Bosnia Herzegovina, Georgia, Iceland, Liechtenstein, North Macedonia, Moldavia, Monaco, Montenegro, Norway, San Marino, Serbia, Switzerland, Turkey, Ukraine, the United Kingdom, and Vatican City.

Although previously members of the CEPT, Belarus and Russia had their memberships suspended, indefinitely, with effect from 00:00 (CET), 18 March 2022. The CEPT Assembly made this decision following a poll of members by the CEPT Presidency, and published their decision on 17 March 2022.)

GSM-R uses a specific frequency band, which can be referred to as the "standard" GSM-R band:
 Uplink: 876–880 MHz used for data transmission
 Downlink: 921–925 MHz used for data reception

In Germany this band was extended with additional channels in the 873–876 MHz and 918–921 MHz range. Being used formerly for regional trunked radio systems the full usage of the new frequencies is aimed for 2015.

China 
GSM-R occupies a 4 MHz wide range of the E-GSM band (900 MHz-GSM).
 Uplink: 885–889 MHz
 Downlink: 930–934 MHz

India 
GSM-R occupies a 1.6 MHz wide range of the P-GSM band (900 MHz-GSM) held by Indian Railways:
 Uplink: 907.8–909.4 MHz
 Downlink: 952.8–954.4 MHz

Australia 
GSM-R is being implemented within DCS 1800 band
 Uplink: 1,770–1,785 MHz
 Downlink: 1,865–1,880 MHz

DCS 1800 band was initially divided and auctioned in paired parcels each of 2 × 2.5 MHz with duplex spacing of 95 MHz. State rail operators acquired six mostly non-grouped parcels which cover 2 × 15 MHz of spectrum to deploy GSM-R.

State rail operators re-licensed 2 x 10 MHz of 1800 MHz spectrum in Adelaide, Brisbane, Melbourne, Perth, and Sydney for Rail Safety and Control Communications. All except for South Australian Department of Planning Transport and Infrastructure (Adelaide) re-licensed 2 x 5 MHz of 1800 MHz spectrum at commercial rates set by Australian Government.

Technical frequency usage in GSM-R 
The used modulation is GMSK modulation (Gaussian Minimum-Shift Keying). GSM-R is a TDMA ("Time-Division Multiple Access") system. Data transmission is made of periodical TDMA frames (with a period of 4.615 ms), for each carrier frequency (physical channel). Each TDMA frame is divided in 8 time slots, named logical channels (577 µs long, each time-slot), carrying 148 bits of information.

There are worries that LTE mobile communication will disturb GSM-R, since it has been given a frequency band rather close to GSM-R. This could cause ETCS disturbances, random emergency braking because of lost communications etc.

As a result, there is an increasing trend towards monitoring and managing GSM-R interference using active and automated testing on board trains and trackside.

Current GSM-R version 
The GSM-R standard specification is divided in two EIRENE specifications:
 Functional Requirement Specification (FRS): the definition of higher lever functional requirements
 System Requirement Specification (SRS): the definition of the technical solutions supporting the functional requirements

EIRENE defines the "Technical Specification for Interoperability" (TSI) as the set of mandatory specifications to be fulfilled to keep compatibility with other European networks; current TSI are FRS 7 and SRS 15. EIRENE also defines non-mandatory specifications, that are called "Interim version", which defines extra features that are likely to become mandatory in the next TSIs. The current versions are 21 December 2015 versions FRS 8.0.0 and SRS 16.0.0
The GSM-R specifications are fairly stable; the latest mandatory upgrade was in 2006. The complete timeline of GSM-R versions is:
 December 2000: FRS 5/SRS 13, first version to be widely installed
 October 2003: FRS 6/SRS 14
 May 2006: FRS 7/SRS 15, current TSI
 June 2010: FRS7.1/SRS 15.1, current Interim version; the main added features over TSI are shunting radio and ETCS data only radio

The current version of GSM-R can run on both R99 and R4 3GPP networks.

GSM-R uses 

GSM-R permits new services and applications for mobile communications in several domains :
 transmission of Long Line Public Address (LLPA) announcements to remote stations down the line
 control and protection (Automatic Train Control/ETCS) and ERTMS
 communication between train driver and regulation center
 communication of on-board working people
 information sending for ETCS
 communication between train stations, classification yard and rail tracks

Main use 
It is used to transmit data between trains and railway regulation centers with level 2 and 3 of ETCS. When the train passes over a Eurobalise, it transmits its new position and its speed, then it receives back agreement (or disagreement) to enter the next track and its new maximum speed. In addition, trackside signals become redundant.

Other uses 

Like other GSM devices, GSM-R equipment can transmit data and voice. New GSM-R features for mobile communication are based on GSM, and are specified by EIRENE project. Call features are:
 PtP Call: Point-to-Point Call, the same type of call as a normal GSM call
 VGCS: Voice Group Call System, quite similar to walkie-talkie communication but with a single uplink handled by the network (only one person can speak at a time)
 VBS: Voice Broadcast System, like a VGCS but only the call initiator can speak (the other are only listeners)
 REC: Railways Emergency Call, is a special VGCS defined as 299 with the highest priority possible (0)
 SEC: Shunting Emergency Call, is a special VGCS defined as 599 with the highest priority possible (0)
 Priority control of all the different calls (PtP, VGCS, VBSm, REC and SEC calls)
There are other additional features:
 Functional Addressing, alias system to call someone registered on the GSM-R network, only by knowing the temporary function user (engine driver of train such-and-such, ...)
 Location Dependent Addressing, routing system to call the most appropriate train controller regarding the current train position by dialling a pre-defined short code
 Shunting mode, when users work on the tracks.

GSM-R features

ASCI (Advanced Speech Call Items) features 
The following definitions are a part of the System Requirements Specification (SRS) as defined by the EIRENE standard.

VGCS (Voice Group Call Service) 
VGCS allows a great number of users to participate in the same call. This feature imitates the analogue PMR (Private Mobile Radio) group call with the PTT key (Push-to-Talk).

Three kinds of users are defined: the Talker, the Listener and the Dispatcher. The talker can become a listener by releasing the PTT key and a listener becomes a talker by pressing the PTT key.

One advantage of VGCS compared to multi-party calls (the GSM conference call feature) is the spectrum efficiency. Indeed, when many users are in the same cell they will use only one frequency for all listeners and two frequencies for the talker (as in point-to-point call). In a multi-party call, one timeslot is dedicated to each user. The second advantage compared to multi-party calls is that it is not necessary to know which mobiles are to take part in the call. A VGCS call is established on a purely geographic basis, subject to a mobile having previously enabled reception of the group concerned.

VBS (Voice Broadcast Service) 
VBS is a broadcast group call: this means that compared to VGCS, only the initiator of the call can speak. The others who join the call can only be listeners. This kind of call is mainly used to broadcast recorded messages or to make announcements.

REC (Railway Emergency Call) 
REC is a group call, or VGCS, dedicated to urgency. It is a higher priority call (REC priority is level 0 – see below : eMLPP).

SEC (Shunting Emergency Call) 
The Shunting Emergency Call is a dedicated group call with the number 599. The call is established with an emergency level priority whose level is the highest possible priority 0. The SEC is enabled and used by devices registered for shunting operations. The establishment of such a call leads to automatic acceptance of the call on all enabled devices within the current area or cell-group configured.

Multi-Level Precedence and Pre-emption Service (eMLPP) 
This defines the user's priority. The different priority levels are:

 A and B: Highest priority levels (not used by GSM-R networks)
 0: Highest priority levels for ASCI and normal calls (mainly used for REC calls)
 1: Lower priority than level 0
 2: Lower priority than level 1
 3: Lower priority than level 2
 4: Lowest priority level (default priority, assigned to Point-to-Point calls)

An Auto-Answering feature with a timer is also available for calls with priority 0, 1 and 2.

GSM-R Numbering Plan 
The EIRENE SRS document defines a fixed numbering plan for GSM-R. It is defined by number prefixes.

{| class="wikitable"
! Prefix
! Usage definition
|-
| 1
| Reserved for short codes
|-
| 2
| Train Function Number
|-
| 3
| Engine Function Number
|-
| 4
| Coach Number
|-
| 50
| Group calls
|-
| 51
| Broadcast calls
|-
| 52–55
| Reserved for international use
|-
| 56–57
| Reserved for national use
|-
| 58
| Reserved for system use
|-
| 59
| Reserved for system use
|-
| 6
| Maintenance and shunting team members
|-
| 7
| Train controllers
|-
| 8
| Mobile Subscriber Number
|-
| 9
| Reserved for breakout codes and national use
|-
| 0
| Reserved for access to public or to other GSM-R networks
|-
|}

Those numbers are used for functional registration and fixed entries for MSISDN or short dialcodes as defined within the HLR. 807660 for example defines a MSISDN of a mobile subscriber. The number 23030301 would be a functional number associated with the train number 30303 and the role of the user 01.

Eirene features

Functional number management 
 Functional numbering
 Allows to call a mobile station by its function: driver of the train xxx , ...
 It uses:
 USSD and Follow Me
 UUS1 (for number display)

 Location dependent addressing
 Establishes a call from a mobile station to (usually) a fixed subscriber/dispatcher performing a function in the area where the mobile station is located.

End Call Confirmation 
End Call Confirmation feature is only available for highest priority (Priority level 0) group calls (VGCS) and broadcast calls (VBS) (see eMLPP).
It consists of an end call report which sent by all mobile stations which joined the high priority call (initiator included). This report informs about:
 Call type
 Call duration
 Mobile station identity
 End call cause Normal, ended by user, mobile station power off by user, power off due to low battery, …)
 …

If the report cannot be sent (mobile station power off by user or power off due to low battery), the mobile station will try again (several times if needed) to send the report at the next power on.

Shunting mode 
Shunting mode is the application that will regulate and control user access to shunting communications.
A Link Assurance Signal (LAS) is provided to give reassurance to the driver that the radio link is working.

Direct mode 
Direct mode is the walkie-talkie mode (mobiles station talking to each other without the network) and has been proposed in Eirene, however it has never been in application since being based on analogue radio.
Sagemcom claims to have developed a GSM direct mode, not currently recognized in the GSM-R specification, and has no frequency allocation.

GSM-R market

GSM-R market groups 
Different groups make up the GSM-R market:

The network operators and the railway operators

{|class="wikitable"
 |+ Contract awarded / Currently implementing:
 |-
 ! Country
 ! Network operator
 ! Railway operator(s)
 ! Equipment
 |-
 |Algeria || SNTF || SNTF/ANESRIF || Kontron/Frequentis AG
 |-
 |Austria || ÖBB-IKT GmbH || ÖBB || Kontron/WINGCON
 |-
 | Australia || Department of Transport Victoria || Metro Trains Melbourne || Nokia Networks/WINGCON
 |-
 | Australia || UGL Limited || RailCorp || Huawei/Frequentis AG
 |-
 | Belgium || Infrabel || NMBS/SNCB|| Nokia Siemens
 |-
 | Bulgaria || NRIC || NRIC|| Kontron/WINGCON/Frequentis AG
 |-
 | China || China Ministry of Railway || CR || Huawei/ZTE
 |-
 | Czech Republic || Správa železnic|| ČD || Kontron
 |-
 | Denmark || Banedanmark || DSB || Nokia Networks + WINGCON/Wenzel Elektronik/Frequentis AG
 |-
 | France || SNCF Réseau || SNCF || Kontron/WINGCON
 |-
 | France/Great Britain || Getlink || Getlink || Kontron/WINGCON/Trans Data Management
 |-
 | Germany || DB Netz || DB || Kontron/WINGCON/Frequentis AG
 |-
 | Great Britain || Network Rail || List of passenger operators || Siemens Mobility + Kontron/WINGCON/Frequentis AG
 |-
 | Greece || OSE S.A. || TrainOSE || Nokia Networks
 |-
 | Hungary || VPE || MÁV || Kontron/WINGCON/Frequentis AG
 |-
 | India || Nokia Siemens Networks || IR || Nokia Siemens/WINGCON + Kontron/Frequentis AG
 |-
 | Ireland || CIÉ || IÉ || Kontron/WINGCON/Frequentis AG
 |-
 | Israel || Israel Railways || Israel Railways || Nokia Networks + Motorola Solutions
 |-
 | Italy || RFI || TI || Nokia Networks + Kontron
 |-
 | Lithuania || Lithuanian Railways || Lithuanian Railways || Kontron/WINGCON/Frequentis AG
 |-
 | Luxembourg || CFL || CFL || Kontron/WINGCON
 |-
 | Netherlands || Mobirail || NS || Nokia Networks/KPN
 |-
 | Norway || Jernbaneverket || NSB || Nokia Networks/WINGCON/Frequentis AG
 |-
 | Poland || PKP PLK || PKP Intercity & others || Nokia Networks + Kontron/WINGCON/Frequentis AG
 |-
 | Saudi Arabia || Thales Group together with Nokia Networks || Saudi Arabian Railways ||
 |-
 | Saudi Arabia || AlShoula together with ADIF || Saudi Arabian Organisation || Kontron/WINGCON/Frequentis AG
|-
 | Slovakia || ŽSR || ZSSK || Kontron/WINGCON
|-
| Slovenia
| AZP
| SŽ
| Kontron/WINGCON/Iskratel, d.o.o
|-
 | Spain || ADIF || RENFE || Nokia Networks + Kontron
 |-
 | Sweden || Trafikverket || SJ, Hector Rail, Green Cargo || Nokia Networks + WINGCON/Wenzel Elektronik
 |-
 | Switzerland || Siemens together with SBB Telecom || SBB/CFF/FFS || WINGCON/Frequentis AG
 |-
 | Switzerland || NSS/BSS: Siemens together with SBB Telecom  || BLS Switzerland || Trans Data Management AG
 |-
 | Turkey || – || Turkish State Railways || Kontron/Frequentis AG
 |-
 | Turkmenistan || – || Turkmen Railways || Huawei
 |-
 |}

{|class="wikitable"
 |+ Planning phase / Contracting:
 |-
 ! Country:
 ! Network operator:
 ! Railway operator(s):
 |-
 | Croatia (Pilot site) || – || HŽ
 |}

{|class="wikitable"
 |+ Feasibility phase:
 |-
 ! Country:
 ! Network operator:
 ! Railway operator(s):
 |-
 | Bangladesh || Bangladesh Railway || Bangladesh Railway
 |-
 | Northern Ireland || – || NIR
 |-
 | Russia || – || Russian Railways
 |-
 | United States || US-DOT || Amtrak
 |}

{|class="wikitable"
 |+ Former users:
 |-
 ! Country:
 ! Network operator:
 ! Railway operator(s):
 ! Equipment:
 ! Discontinued:
 ! Comments:
 |-
 | Finland || Väylävirasto || VR || Nokia SiemensFrequentis AG || 30.04.2019 || Users were switched to the existing TETRA-based national VIRVE government radio network.This was favored over the option of replacing the current end-of-life GSM-R network.
 |}

Railways using GSM-R

Australia 
Transport NSW is installing a Digital Train Radio System (DTRS) throughout the  electrified rail network, including 66 tunnels covering , bounded by Kiama, Macarthur, Lithgow, Bondi Junction and Newcastle with GSM-R to replace the existing analogue MetroNet train radio. The replacement will fulfil recommendations from the Special Commission of Inquiry into the Waterfall rail accident to provide a common platform of communication for staff working on the railway. The equipment will be installed at about 250 locations and more than 60 sites in tunnels. The old analogue network was dismantled in 2020.

Public Transport Victoria has installed a Digital Train Radio System (DTRS) on the Melbourne train network with GSM-R to replace the old system called Urban Train Radio System (UTRS).  The equipment was installed at about 100 locations. It cost $152 million.

France  

In France, the first commercial railway route opened with full GSM-R coverage is the LGV Est européenne linking Paris Gare de l'Est to Strasbourg. It was opened on 10 June 2007.
 On Sunday, 10 June 2007 at 06:43, the first high speed train to run on it was the ICE, the high speed train from the German passenger operator: Deutsche Bahn. It linked the Gare de l'Est in Paris to Saarbrücken (Germany).
 On the same day, at 07:15, it was the opportunity of the TGV POS, the latest generation high speed train from the French operator, SNCF. It linked Strasbourg to Paris (Gare de l'Est).

Italy 
Roaming agreements with other Italian mobile operators allow coverage of lines not directly served by GSM-R. Roaming agreements have also been set up with French and Swiss railway companies and it is planned to extend them to other countries.

Netherlands 
In the Netherlands, there is coverage on all the lines and the old system called Telerail was abandoned in favour of GSM-R in 2006.

Norway 
In Norway, the GSM-R network was opened on all lines on 1 January 2007, replacing the older Scanet network.

UK Mainland 

 By October 2013, both the West Coast Main Line (WCML) and East Coast Main Line (ECML) to Scotland were covered by GSM-R and UK train operator Northern Rail had implemented GSM-R on a significant number of routes in North and North-West of England. 
In spring 2013, the Association of Train Operating Companies' website GSM-R Online announced that the implementation of the Southern half of the UK GSM-R system was complete as the final CA15 section had gone live (The UK GSM-R Project implementation divided the Mainland North and South of a map-line running from the Severn in the West to the Wash on the East coast). Infrastructure and installation work continued North of this division. Britain's GSM-R network was originally expected to be fully operational by 2013, but due to slippage in equipment fitting a later date became more likely. However, a Rail Safety & Standards Board document indicated that the UK's Telecommunications Regulator, Ofcom, was to withdraw the existing NRN 205 MHz frequencies by 2015. Britain's GSM-R network's cost was originally put at £1.2 billion. That cost though did not include the WCML.
 The Cambrian Line ERTMS – Pwllheli to Harlech Rehearsal commenced on 13 February 2010 and successfully finished on 18 February 2010. The driver familiarisation and practical handling stage of the Rehearsal had provided an excellent opportunity to monitor the use of GSM-R voice in operation on this route. The first train departed Pwllheli at 08:53hrs in ERTMS Level 2 Operation with GSM-R voice being used as the only means of communication between the driver and the signaller.
 Network Rail fitted out a test train at Derby it purchased for RSV testing of the GSM-R network. The train was formed from ex Gatwick Express stock. At a cost of £5.9 million, this custom-built machine known as the RSV (Radio Signal Verification) train started monitoring the Newport Synergy scheme and the Cambrian Line.
 On 2 September 2009, the Rugby to Stoke section went live.
 The first train (Virgin Trains West Coast 390034 on the 09:15 Manchester Piccadilly service to London Euston) to use GSM-R on the south end of the WCML ran on 27 May 2009. This was the first vehicle to run in passenger service with GSM-R outside of the Strathclyde trial.
 A fully functional GSM-R system had been on trial on the North Clyde Line in Scotland since 2007. For some years before these trials commenced however, GSM-R had been in use for voice-only purposes – known as the 'Interim Voice Radio System' (IVRS) – in some locations where axle counters are used for train detection, for example parts of the WCML between Crewe and Wembley.

, the only areas of UK Network Rail still currently employing VHF train radio communications are on sections of the Highland and Far North lines in Scotland, where the Radio Electronic Token Block system is utilised, using modified Ofcom frequencies around 180 MHz, having been de-scoped from the National GSM-R plan, due to practical difficulties involved in deploying the GSM-R system in this region. Currently, 100% of the UK network has GSM-R coverage.

Gallery

References

External links 
 GSM-R at the International Union of Railways

European Rail Traffic Management System
GSM standard
Rail transport mobile telecommunications standards